Stay Young may refer to:

Songs
 "Stay Young", a song by Coloured Stone
 "Stay Young (Gallagher & Lyle song)", a song by Gallagher & Lyle, notably covered by Don Williams in 1983
 "Stay Young (INXS song)", a single by INXS from their 1981 album, Underneath the Colours
 "Stay Young (Oasis song)", the B-side to the 1997 single "D'You Know What I Mean?" by Oasis
 "Stay Young (Strata song)", a single by Strata from their 2007 album, Strata Presents The End of the World
 "Stay Young", a song by Ultrasound from their 1999 album Everything Picture
 "Stay Young", a song by We the Kings from their 2007 album We the Kings

Albums
 Stay Young 1979–1982, a compilation album by INXS released in 2002